Howly (IPA:ˈhaʊlɪ) is a town and a municipality in Barpeta district in the Indian state of Assam.

Places To Visit In Howly town
Howly Rass Mela
Howly Rass Mela is the biggest Festival in Assam. Millions of people come to see the festival every year in Howly. Howly Rass Mahotsov started in the year of 1928.

Howly Rass Mandir
Howly Raas Mandir is the biggest Temple in Howly Town area. There is a beautiful pond near the temple. Millions of people visit this temple every year during Rass Mahotsav.

Martyrs column of Howly
The newly made Howly Swahid Bedi (Martyrs Column) is one of the most beautifully constructed Martyrs Columns in Assam and it was inaugurated by former Assam Chief Minister Sarbananda Sonowal in 2020.

Mairamara Namati Satra
Mairamara Namati Satra was established by Mukunda Dev.

Madan Mohan Kirtan Ghar
Madan Mohan Kirtan Ghar is situated near the Howly Rass Mandir. This Kirtanghar was established in the year 1978.

Kaljhar Satra
This is an old satra established in Kaljhar Village. Kaljhar Village is 3 km far from Howly Town.

Sericulture Farm
This farm was started in 1954 in Halapakuri Village. The natural scenery of this farm is very beautiful with a huge campus.

 Krishi Vigyan Kendra
Krishi Vigyan Kendra is located at Howly Khatalpara Road. The website for Krishi Vigyan Kendra, Barpeta is kvk.icar.gov.in.

Howly Sarbajonin Shri Shri Radha Gobinda Mandir
Radha Gobinda Mandir is also a beautiful Temple located in Howly Thakurbari Road.

Chandi Barua Memorial hall
The old Chandi Barua Memorial Hall was made in the year of 1954. Many famous artists like Kalaguru Bishnu Prasad Rabha, Phani Sharma performed their act in this historic Hall. The new Hall was inaugurated by former Chief Minister of Assam Sarbananda Sonowal in 2020.

Chandi Baruah Sports Complex
Chandi Baruah Sports Complex is the largest Sports complex of Lower Assam. There is a big field surrounded by a well-constructed Pavilion.

Howly Hanuman Mandir
Howly Hanuman Mandir is a very popular temple amongst the Hindu Community of Howly.

Manas National Park
The Manas National Park was declared a sanctuary on 1 October 1928 with an area of 360 km. Manas bio reserve was created in 1973. This park is 30 km far from Howly Town. and howly to barpeta road distance is 10.3 km.

 Madhya Bazar Kali Mandir
Madhya Bazar Kali Mandir is the oldest temple of Howly. In 1908 this temple was established at the Madhya Bazar area.

Geography
It has an average elevation of 43 metres (141 feet).

Demographics
 India census, Howly had a population of 15,958. Males constitute 52% of the population and females 48%. Howly has an average literacy rate of 97%, higher than the national average of 59.5%: male literacy is 99%, and female literacy is 96%. In Howly, 14% of the population is under 6 years of age.

This town is mainly divided into 10 parts which are 10 wards.

Education
There are several government as well as private institutions at Howly: 
B.H College is situated between the towns of Howly and Barpeta Road.
Howly High School is situated in the heart of howly town. It is the oldest school of howly. It was established in 1939.
Adarsha Vidyapith High School, Howly Girls High School, Normal School are some of the major schools of the town.
On
Howly Jatiya Vidyalay, Sankardev Shishu Vidya Niketan are some of the Assamese medium private schools of the town.
Hazrat Omar(R) Model Academy School, Holy Child English Academy, St. Xavier High School are the notable English medium schools of the town.
Howly Junior College
 Only fully residential Science Academy Howly National Science Academy 
 Maulana Abul Kalam Azad Academy (MAKAA)
 Ramanujan Academy, Howly
 ShikshaJyoti Academy, Howly (S.J.A., HOWLY)

Culture
Howly bears the similar tones of Bihu with other towns in Assam but hollygeet and jatragaan are popular in this town festivals. Howli Rash Mahotsav is the biggest Rash Mela festival of Assam. It is celebrated for 15 days every year in the months of November–December.

References

Cities and towns in Barpeta district